Stella and Charles Guttman Community College is a public community college in New York City. It is the newest of the City University of New York's (CUNY) community colleges and was founded on September 11, 2011.  It opened on August 20, 2012 as New Community College. In April 2013 the college was renamed following a $15 million endowment from the Stella and Charles Guttman Foundation.

Guttman offers associate degree programs with majors in liberal arts, sciences, business, human services, information technology (IT), and urban studies. Students are accepted with either a high school diploma or Certificate of High School Equivalency.

History

Guttman was the first new community college established by City University of New York (CUNY) in over 40 years. The planning was begun in 2008 on the initiative of CUNY's Chancellor at the time, Matthew Goldstein. The planning phase was supported by CUNY funds, an initial allocation $8.9 million from the City of New York's annual budget, and donations from the Bill and Melinda Gates Foundation and Michael Bloomberg's Center for Economic Opportunity. Described by The New York Times as "a multimillion-dollar experiment in how to fix what ails community colleges," Guttman College's academic structure and curriculum were designed from scratch in an effort to improve students' chances of completing their associate degrees and transferring to four-year colleges for further study.

In 2010, the first faculty were appointed and Scott E. Evenbeck, professor of psychology and dean of University College at Indiana University-Purdue University Indianapolis, was named the founding President, taking up his post in January 2011. The college was officially established on September 11, 2011 and opened with its first intake of students in August 2012. The college had, and continues to have, an open admissions policy, provided students have a high school diploma or a Certificate of High School Equivalency. However, unlike any of the other schools within CUNY, applicants are not considered until they have attended a lengthy information session and one-on-one interviews with counselors. Of its initial 4,000 applicants, 504 went through the information session and interviews. Of those, approximately 300 decided to enroll in the founding class.

The college opened under the name "New Community College." In April 2013 following the gift of a $15 million endowment from the Stella and Charles Guttman Foundation, one of the largest ever donations to a public two-year college, the CUNY Board of Trustees passed a resolution renaming the college "Stella and Charles Guttman Community College."

References
Notes

Further reading
Alexandra Weinbaum, Camille Rodríguez, Nan Bauer-Maglin (February 2013).  Rethinking Community College for the 21st Century. Case study funded by the Bill and Melissa Gates Foundation for the New Community College at CUNY.

Colleges of the City University of New York
Educational institutions established in 2011
2011 establishments in New York City
Universities and colleges in Manhattan
Community colleges in New York City
Midtown Manhattan